Naguabo is a town and municipality in Puerto Rico located in the east coast of the island bordered by the Vieques Passage, north of Humacao; south of Río Grande and Ceiba; and east of Las Piedras. Naguabo is spread over 8 barrios and Naguabo Pueblo (the downtown area and the administrative center of the city). It is part of the San Juan-Caguas-Guaynabo Metropolitan Statistical Area.

Naguabo is renowned for and is said to be the birthplace of the pastelillo de chapín, which is a popular food in Puerto Rico. It is trunkfish wrapped inside deep-fried flour dough. Pastelillos de chapín can be found in almost any seaside establishment on the island.

History
The town of Naguabo was founded near a ravine on the east coast and relocated in 1821 to its current location.  In 1878, Naguabo had the following barrios: Pueblo, Maizales, Duque, Mariana, Quebrada Palma, Daguao, Santiago y Lima, Húcares, Río, Peña Pobre and Río Blanco. In 1521, Daguao was burned down by Caribs.

Puerto Rico was ceded by Spain in the aftermath of the Spanish–American War under the terms of the Treaty of Paris of 1898 and became a territory of the United States. In 1899, the United States Department of War conducted a census of Puerto Rico finding that the population of Naguabo was 10,873.

On September 20, 2017 Hurricane Maria struck Puerto Rico. In Naguabo, barrio Húcares on the coast was the most affected with most homes destroyed or losing the roof. The boardwalk was destroyed and over 6,000 people reported losses.

Geography
Naguabo is located in the southeast region of Puerto Rico. The highest point in the municipality is Pico del Este in the Sierra de Luquillo at 3,419 feet (1,042 m) of elevation.

Río Blanco and Río Espiritu Santo are located in Naguabo.

Barrios

Like all municipalities of Puerto Rico, Naguabo is subdivided into barrios.

Daguao
Duque
Húcares
Maizales
Mariana
Naguabo barrio-pueblo
Peña Pobre
Río
Río Blanco
Santiago y Lima

Sectors

Barrios (which are like minor civil divisions) and subbarrios, in turn, are further subdivided into smaller local populated place areas/units called sectores (sectors in English). The types of sectores may vary, from normally sector to urbanización to reparto to barriada to residencial, among others.

Special Communities

 (Special Communities of Puerto Rico) are marginalized communities whose citizens are experiencing a certain amount of social exclusion. A map shows these communities occur in nearly every municipality of the commonwealth. Of the 742 places that were on the list in 2014, the following barrios, communities, sectors, or neighborhoods were in Naguabo: Relámpago neighborhood, Río, Santiago y Lima, Daguao, La Florida, Casco Urbano in barrio-pueblo, Húcares, Maizales, Parcelas La Fe, and Río Blanco.

Demographics

Tourism

Landmarks and places of interest

There are 31 beaches in Naguabo.
The main attractions in Naguabo are:
Algodones Key
El Yunque National Forest (South Side via PR State Road 191 - Closed at KM 13 (mile marker 8.1) (approx.) due to Road Closure)
Naguabo Beach
Punta Lima Beach
Ramón Rivero "Diplo" Monument
Tropical Beach
Yudelmi Center
Pedro Flores Monument
Hucares Waterfront (El Malecón - the boardwalk)
the main town square (Plaza De Recreo)
Charco El Hippie

Culture

Festivals and events
Naguabo celebrates its patron saint festival in October. The  is a religious and cultural celebration that generally features parades, games, artisans, amusement rides, regional food, and live entertainment.

Other festivals and events celebrated in Naguabo include:
Maratón Cervecero en Naguabo -January
Chapín Festival - February
Pedro Flores Week - March
Diplo Festival - June
Virgen del Carmen Fiesta - July 16

Economy

Symbols
The  has an official flag and coat of arms.

Flag
This municipality has a flag.

Coat of arms
This municipality has a coat of arms.

Transportation
There is public transportation in Naguabo. It operates from 6:00 a.m. using the "Pisicorre" bus.
There are 52 bridges in Naguabo.

Government
Naguabo is led by a mayor. On January 2, 2021, Miraidaliz Rosario Pagán from the Popular Democratic Party (Puerto Rico) began her term as mayor of Naguabo.

Books about Naguabo
Historia de Naguabo by Carmelo Rosario Natal

Gallery

See also

List of Puerto Ricans
History of Puerto Rico
Did you know-Puerto Rico?

References

External links
 Puerto Rico Government Directory - Naguabo

 
Municipalities of Puerto Rico